San'in Expressway (山陰自動車道 San'in Jidōsha-dō) is a proposed expressway extending from Tottori, Tottori prefecture to Mine, Yamaguchi prefecture, of Japan. It will follow a path along the northern (San'in) coast of Chūgoku region, passing through Tottori, Shimane, and Yamaguchi prefectures. It is numbered "E9" along with the Kyoto Jukan Expressway and the San'in Kinki Expressway.

Currently, the following segments are designated as part of the National Expressway route:
Tottori-Masuda Route (鳥取益田線): Tottori -- Masuda, Shimane
Misumi Mine Route (三隅美祢線): Nagato, Yamaguchi -- Mine

List of interchanges and features 

 IC - interchange, SIC - smart interchange, JCT - junction, SA - service area, PA - parking area, BS - bus stop, TN - tunnel, TB - toll gate, BR - bridge
 Bus stops labeled "○" are currently in use; those marked "◆" are closed.

Between Tottori Junction and Suko Interchange

Between Kiyo-Higashi Interchange and Ozuki Junction

References

Expressways in Japan
Roads in Shimane Prefecture
Roads in Tottori Prefecture
Roads in Yamaguchi Prefecture